Temporal is the sixth studio album by Canadian cellist Julia Kent. It was released on January 25, 2019 through The Leaf Label.

Track listing

References

2019 albums
The Leaf Label albums